The 1993 Guam earthquake occurred on August 8 at  with a moment magnitude of 7.8 and a maximum Mercalli intensity of IX (Violent). The thrust earthquake generated a non-destructive tsunami.

Damage and casualties

See also
List of earthquakes in 1993
List of earthquakes in Guam

References

Further reading

Lander, James & Whiteside, Lowell & Lockridge, Patricia. (2003). Two decades of global tsunamis 1982–2002. Science of Tsunami Hazards. 21. pp. 30, 31

External links
 
M7.8 - Guam region – United States Geological Survey

1993 earthquakes
Earthquake
Earthquakes in Guam
Tsunamis in Guam